JDS Noshiro (DE-223) was the tenth ship of the s of Japan Maritime Self-Defense Force.

Development and design 
The main anti-submarine (ASW) weapon was changed from the M/50  ASW rocket launcher to the ASROC anti-submarine missile. The octuple launcher for ASROC was stationed at the mid-deck, and the entire ship design was prescribed by this stationing.

Construction and career
Yoshiro was laid down on 27 January 1976 at Mitsui Engineering & Shipbuilding, Tamano and launched on 23 December 1976. The vessel was commissioned on 30 June 1977 into the 33rd Escort Corps of the Yokosuka District Force.

On July 5, 1979, she was transferred to the 35th Escort Corps of the 4th Escort Corps, and the home port was transferred to Ominato.

On March 27, 1982, the 35th Escort Corps was reorganized under the control of the Ominato District Force.

On March 27, 1985, she was transferred to the 38th Escort Corps of the Kure District Force, and the home port was transferred to Kure.

Joined the 22nd Escort Corps of the Kure District Force on April 15, 1998.

Removed from the register on March 13, 2003. The total itinerary during commissioning reached 541,588.9 nautical miles, about 25 laps around the globe.

References

1976 ships
Ships built by Mitsui Engineering and Shipbuilding
Chikugo-class destroyer escorts